Thomas Richard Phineas Riall (born 1960) is the chief executive officer (CEO) of Priory Group since April 2013.

Biography
Riall took over as the CEO of Priory Group in April 2013. Prior to that appointment, he had served as chief executive of Serco's global services business since June 2012. Serco is a UK company that provides a variety of services and products relating to defence, detention, aviation, and transport.  Riall was previously divisional chief executive responsible for the company's home affairs division, which provides Gatso speed cameras to UK local authorities.

Prior to joining Serco in 2004, he was managing director of Reliance Secure Trust Management.  Riall oversaw Reliance's successful tender in 2003 for the use of private contractors to transport prisoners in Scotland.  When the firm mistakenly released a number of prisoners including a convicted murderer in 2004, Riall offered an apology while defending his company's performance.

This was his third speeding offence. In asking the judge not to impose a driving ban, he noted that the incident had caused him "considerable embarrassment" and said that the prospect of having to pay £30,000 for private chauffeurs might mean that he would be unable to continue paying for private schools for his three children.

Riall lives at Ufton Nervet, near Reading in Berkshire. His wife, Mary, daughter of Sir William Benyon, was appointed High Sheriff of Berkshire in April 2020.

References

1960 births
Living people
British businesspeople
Serco people
People from Ufton Nervet
Benyon family